Sfiso Ncwane (April 21, 1979 – December 5, 2016) was a South African singer and composer.

In 1997, Ncwane joined Mlazi based band called New Edition, joining lead vocalist Ntombifuthi Mntambo and drummer Skhumbuzo Gumede. Ncwane also join a group band called 'One Touch', lead vocalist Mr Joe Gcabashe and the Keyboard players: Sikhona Gumede and Senzo Sabela.

Ncwane signed  a record deal with Bula Music and released his debut studio  album Makadunyiswe in 2001.

At the 20th ceremony of Mzansi Gospel Awards, Ncwane scooped two awards Best Praise Album of the Year and Worship Album of the Year. "Kulungile Baba" was certified 3× platinum in South Africa with sales of 350 000 copies and won Record of the Year at the 19th ceremony of South African Music Awards and also nominated for SABC Crown Gospel Awards Song of the Year. On July 5, 2016, his last album  Wethembekile Baba was released in South Africa.

Death 
On December 4, 2016, Ncwane was hospitalised at Life Fourways Hospital, Johannesburg and died  at the age of 37.

Philanthropy
He started charity called Sfiso Ncwane Bursary Foundation, which donated school uniforms to children in rural areas.

Autobiography
 Ayanda Ncwane (2018).	For the Love of Sfiso Ncwane Kindle Edition, Izani Publishing,

Discography

Albums
 Makadunyiswe (2001)
 Ufanelwe (2005)
Baba Ngiyavuma (2007)
Uyisiphephelo Sami (2008)

Baba Ngiyabonga (2009)
Umkhuleko (2009)
 Kulungile Baba (2010)
 Vula Amasango (2011)
 Bayede Baba (2014)
 Wethembekile Baba (2016)
 Kulungile Baba Live (2019)

References

1979 births
2016 deaths
Deaths from kidney failure
South African gospel singers